Jean-Claude Druart (25 August 1927 – 23 October 1994) was a French footballer.  He competed in the men's tournament at the 1952 Summer Olympics.

References

External links
 
 

1927 births
1994 deaths
French footballers
Olympic footballers of France
Footballers at the 1952 Summer Olympics
Association football midfielders
Racing Club de France Football players
Footballers from Paris